Mount Washington is a small mountain in the US state of Washington roughly  east-southeast of Seattle, Washington along Interstate 90.  It lies on the western margin of the Cascade Range just above the coastal plains around Puget Sound, and is southeast of nearby town of North Bend.

Once known as Profile Mountain, Mount Washington was named due to a cliff resembling a profile of George Washington when viewed from an angle.

The hike to the top of Mt. Washington is known for its view.  Cedar Butte lies at the west end of the mountain.

See also 
 Mount Si
 Little Si

References 

Mountains of King County, Washington
Mountains of Washington (state)